The 2008 Iowa State Cyclones football team represented Iowa State University in the 2008 NCAA Division I FBS football season. The team was led by head coach Gene Chizik, who had coached the Cyclones since 2007. They played their home games at Jack Trice Stadium in Ames, Iowa.

Schedule

Roster

Coaching staff

Gene Chizik: Head Coach (1 yr)
Robert McFarland: Offensive Coordinator (1 yr)
Wayne Bolt: Defensive Coordinator (1 yr)
Scott Fountain (TE/RC (2yr)

Game summaries

South Dakota State

Kent State

Iowa

UNLV

Kansas

Baylor

Nebraska

Texas A&M

#10 Oklahoma State

Colorado

#11 Missouri

Kansas State

After the season

Awards
No Cyclone player or coach won any awards this season.

References

Iowa State
Iowa State Cyclones football seasons
Iowa State Cyclones football